A trail is a route for travel.

Trail may also refer to:

Places 
Trail, British Columbia, Canada
Trail, Minnesota, United States
Trail, Oregon, United States

People with the name
Trail (surname), e.g., the Scottish clan also known as Traill
Chet Trail (born 1944), American baseball player

Other uses 
 Ant trail; see also Animal track
 Trail (graph theory)
Trail, design parameter for vehicles with two in-line wheels, such as bicycles and motorcycles
 Trail, the trailing end of a gun carriage
TRAIL, acronym in molecular biology for "TNF-related apoptosis-inducing ligand"
 Pointertrails, or mouse trails, show where the GUI pointer has been recently
Technical Report Archive & Image Library, also known as TRAIL
Trails (series), series of video games

See also 
 Auto trail, a former, informal network of marked roads in United States and Canada
 Contrail, a condensation trail
 Distrail, a dissipation trial
 Path (disambiguation)
 T-rail, flanged T rail for railroading
 Vapor trail